Heino Kurvet (12 September 1941 in Mõisaküla – 9 April 2020) was an Estonian sprint canoer who competed in the early 1970s for the Soviet Union. He won a bronze medal in the K-4 10,000 m event at the 1971 ICF Canoe Sprint World Championships in Belgrade.

References

Sources

1941 births
2020 deaths
People from Mulgi Parish
Estonian male canoeists
Soviet male canoeists
ICF Canoe Sprint World Championships medalists in kayak